Unión Deportiva Cultural Chantrea is a Spanish football team based in Pamplona, in the autonomous community of Navarre. Founded in 1952, it plays in Tercera División - Group 15, holding home games at Estadio Chantrea, with a capacity of 3,500 seats. 

Chantrea (also sometimes known with the Basque spelling Txantrea) is the representative team for the neighbourhood of the same name, a working-class area with a strong sense of community identity, built in the 1950s to provide housing for migrants from rural areas of Navarre. The club has a long-term collaboration agreement with Athletic Club (renewed in 2017 for another four years) which has seen several promising players move to the Bilbao team. Recent graduates include Borja Ekiza, Iñigo Pérez, Mikel San José, Gorka Iraizoz and Iker Muniain, all of whom played a role in their run to the 2012 UEFA Europa League Final.

Season to season

1 season in Segunda División B
49 seasons in Tercera División

Famous players
 Miguel Ángel Sola
 Javi Gracia
 José Manuel Mateo
 David Cuéllar
 Gorka Iraizoz
 Mikel San José
 Anaitz Arbilla
 Roberto Torres Morales
 Iñigo Pérez
 Borja Ekiza
 Iker Muniain
 Íñigo Eguaras

References

External links
Official website 
Futbolme team profile 

Football clubs in Navarre
Sport in Pamplona
Association football clubs established in 1952
1952 establishments in Spain